Henry Tubb (16 June 1851 – 8 February 1924) was an English first-class cricketer and clergyman.

The son of Henry Michael Tubb, he was born at Bicester in February 1851 and was educated at Rugby School. A keen cricketer, Tubb played club cricket for Bicester Cricket Club. He played first-class cricket for the Marylebone Cricket Club between 1873 and 1877, making five appearances all against Oxford University at Oxford. Described by Scores and Biographies as a "good batsman" and a "middle-paced round-armed bowler", he scored 93 runs in his five first-class matches, with a highest score of 24, while going wicket-less with the ball. Tubb was dismissed caught in unusual fashion in a club match when he struck a ball into the air, which then hit a swift and fell into the hands of a fielder. A well known figure in Oxfordshire cricket, Tubb was a founding member of the original Oxfordshire County Cricket Club and presided over its second public meeting in March 1891 at the Clarendon Hotel, during which he was elected a vice-president of the county club. Outside of cricket, he worked in Bicester as a banker. Tubb died at Chesterton in February 1924, following a short illness; the month before his death he had been elected president of the Oxfordshire Agricultural Society.

References

External links

1851 births
1924 deaths
People from Bicester
People educated at Rugby School
English cricketers
Marylebone Cricket Club cricketers
English cricket administrators